Kentucky is the fortieth richest state in the United States of America, with a per capita income of $26,779 (2017).

Kentucky Counties by Per Capita Income

Note: Data is from the 2010 United States Census Data and the 2006-2010 American Community Survey 5-Year Estimates.

References

Kentucky
Locations by per capita income
Income